(the ep) is an EP, the third release by Mike Kinsella under the name Owen. It was released on May 4, 2004, on Polyvinyl Records. On April 17, 2004, "In the Morning, Before Work" was made available for download.

Track listing

Guest musicians
Cale Parks on vibraphone
Bob Hoffnar on pedal steel
Jen Tabor on cello and violin

Vinyl pressing
In addition to being released on by Polyvinyl Records, it was also pressed on translucent yellow vinyl by Mi Amante Records.

References

Owen (musician) EPs
2004 EPs
Polyvinyl Record Co. EPs